William Henry Pope (February 15, 1847 – February 15, 1913) was an American soldier, lawyer, and State Senator from Texas district 3. Pope was influential in writing and passing Texas Jim Crow laws and described himself as the "Jim Crow Senator".

Personal life
William Henry Pope was born on February 15, 1847, in Washington, Georgia, to Alexander and Sarah "Willie" Pope. Him and his family moved to Marshall, Texas, in 1858. He attended Marshall University before enrolling in the Confederate Army in the winter of 1863. He served as a scout for in Terry's Texas Rangers until the end of the American Civil War. He then studied law at the University of Virginia. In 1872, he married Fannie Stedman, whom he had 4 children with.

Death
Pope died on his 66th birthday on February 15, 1913, in a Waco hospital of uremic poisoning, his resting place is in Marshall, Texas.

Political career
Pope was first elected as Harris county attorney in 1869, he failed to be reelected in 1870. He was reelected as Harris county attorney in 1876 and 1878. He then served 10 years in the Texas Senate representing district 3. He often referred to himself as a "Jim Crow Senator". In 1889, Pope authored a law that required African Americans and White Americans to sit in separate coaches. He also appointed by Governor Lawrence Ross to serve as a special agent to the United States Congress to push agendas, he was in Washington, D.C., for 4 years. In 1902, Pope was elected judge of the Fifty-eighth Judicial District. He was affiliated with the Democratic Party.

References

1847 births
1913 deaths
Texas state senators
19th-century American politicians